Stellar Adventure is a 1980 video game published by Software Innovations for the TRS-80.

Contents
Stellar Adventure is a game in which the player earns points by discovering artifacts on planets, and in space battles against Kyraxian fighters and dreadnoughts.

Reception
Jon Mishcon reviewed Stellar Adventure in The Space Gamer No. 39. Mishcon commented that "For the price I feel this is a good buy. Certainly you will enjoy the first few hours of play. In its present state, I don't believe I'd call it a classic."

References

1980 video games
TRS-80 games
TRS-80-only games
Video games developed in the United States